The 1981 Hama massacre was an incident in which over 300 residents of Hama, Syria, were killed by government security forces.

Background

From 1976 to 1982, Islamists, including the Muslim Brotherhood, fought the Ba'ath Party-controlled government of Syria in what has been called a "long campaign of terror". In July 1980, the ratification of Law No. 49 made membership in the Muslim Brotherhood a capital offense. Middle East Watch (part of Human Rights Watch) called the period between 1976 and 1982 "The Great Repression." According to Middle East Watch,

The massacre
The 1981 Hama massacre occurred after a failed attack around 21–22 April 1981 by armed Islamist guerrillas (reports identify a security checkpoint or a spring festival) near an Alawite village near Hama. As a revenge action, government units deployed into Hama and launched house-to-house searches, sealing off neighborhoods as street fighting erupted. A curfew was imposed and Syrian Army troops entered the city. Between Thursday 23 April 1981 and Sunday 26 April 1981, security forces killed scores to hundreds of residents - between 150 and "several hundred", according to The Washington Post, or at least 350, plus 600 injured, according to authors Olivier Carré and Gérard Michaud chosen randomly among the male population over the age of 14. The killings were carried out by the government's "Protection Brigades" (a palace guard commanded by the president's brother Rifaat al-Assad, and Syrian Special Forces commanded by General Ali Haidar, an Alawite and Assad aide, according to the Post, while Human Rights Watch identified Syrian Special Forces and the Syrian Arab Army's 47th Brigade.

The Washington Post described the incident as "believed to have been the bloodiest retribution so far in President Hafez Assad's two-year crackdown on opponents to his rule".

Aftermath

See also
 2004 al-Qamishli riots
 Black September in Jordan
 List of massacres in Syria
 List of modern conflicts in the Middle East

Further reading
Conduit, Dara. "The Syrian Muslim Brotherhood and the Spectacle of Hama." The Middle East Journal 70.2 (2016): 211–226.
Conduit, Dara. "The Patterns of Syrian Uprising: Comparing Hama in 1980–1982 and Homs in 2011." British Journal of Middle Eastern Studies 44.1 (2017): 73–87.

References

Conflicts in 1981
Massacres in 1981
1981 in Syria
History of Hama
Massacres in Syria
Massacres of men
Political repression in Syria
Islamist uprising in Syria
Violence against men in Asia
Massacres committed by Syria